Bal Gopal Maharjan is a retired Nepali football player who most recently was coaching the Nepal men's national team.
He was in the squad which won the historic 1993 SAG gold. After his retirement from football Bal Gopal has been busy coaching different age level Nepalese teams.

Career
His major achievement during his playing career was the 1993 South Asian Games gold medal. From 1991 to 1993, he played for Bangladeshi club Brothers Union. After retirement, he started his coaching career with Three Star Club of Nepal.

Maharjan led the national team to victory in the 2015 SAFF U-19 Championship and again in 2016 Bangabandhu Cup.

On 1 June 2016, Bal Gopal was appointed head coach of Brothers Union on a three-month contract, thus became the first Nepali to coach a top-tier football club in another country.

On 10 June 2018, he was appointed as the assistant coach of Nepal national football team under head coach Koji Gyotoku ahead of 2018 Asian Games.

On 25 August 2018, he was appointed as the interim head coach of the national team. Maharjan takes over from head coach Koji Gyotoku after the Japanese national was entangled into visa issues.

On 8 September 2018, Nepal defeated hosts Bangladesh 2–0 to enter the semifinals of 2018 SAFF Championship and Bal Gopal Maharjan became the first Nepalese coach to lead Nepal to SAFF semifinals.

He also managed Nepal, that won 2021 Three Nations Cup defeating Bangladesh.

Managerial statistics

Honours

Player

Brothers Union
Bangladesh Federation Cup (1): 1991
Nepal
SAG Football (1): 1993

Manager
Nepal U20
SAFF U-19 Championship (1): 2015
Nepal
Bangabandhu Cup (1): 2016
Three Nations Cup (1): 2021
Nepal U23
South Asian Games (1): 2019

See also
All Nepal Football Association
Nepal women's national football team
Nepal national under-17 football team
Nepal national under-20 football team
Nepal national under-23 football team

References

Living people
Nepal national football team managers
Year of birth missing (living people)
Place of birth missing (living people)
South Asian Games gold medalists for Nepal
Nepalese football managers
South Asian Games medalists in football
South Asian Games silver medalists for Nepal
Footballers at the 1998 Asian Games
Asian Games competitors for Nepal
Nepalese expatriate sportspeople in Bangladesh
Association footballers not categorized by position
Association football players not categorized by nationality
Nepalese expatriate football managers
Brothers Union players
Expatriate football managers in Bangladesh